The Ministry of Justice is the Portuguese government ministry responsible for the administration of the judiciary system. It is headed by the Minister of Justice.

The Ministry of Justice should not be confused with the Public Ministry. This last one is not a Government ministry - despite the name - but the independent body of magistrates of the Judiciary charged with the public prosecution and the legal representation of the State before the courts.

Unlike usual in other countries, the Portuguese Minister of Justice does not have any kind of hierarchic authority over the public prosecutors.

Roles
The roles of the Ministry of Justice include:
 to conceive, to conduct, to execute and to assess the policy of Justice defined by the Assembly of the Republic and by the Government;
 to assure the relationship of the Government with the courts, the Public Ministry, the Higher Council of Magistrates and the Higher Council of the Administrative and Tax Courts.

History
The present Ministry of Justice was created in 1821 as the Secretariat of State of the Ecclesiastical and Justice Affairs (also referred as the Ministry of Ecclesiastical and Justice Affairs). In 1910, it became the Ministry of Justice and Cults and in 1940, it became the Ministry of Justice.

Organization
The Ministry of Justice is headed by the minister, assisted by the Secretary of State of Justice.

The following agencies are part of the Ministry of Justice:
 Directorate-General of the Policy of Justice
 Inspectorate-General of the Services of Justice
 Secretariat-General of the Ministry of Justice
 Judiciary Police
 Directorate-General of the Administration of Justice
 Directorate-General of the Probation and Prison Services
 Institute of Justice Equipment and Facilities Management
 Institute of Registers and Notary
 National Institute of Legal Medicine and Forensic Sciences
 Center of Judiciary Studies
 Crime Victims Protection Commission
 Insolvency Administrators Activity Control and Appreciation Commission

List of ministers

Regency of D. Pedro (1830-1834)

Constitutional Monarchy (1830-1910)

First Republic (1911-1926)

Provisional Government (1910-1911)

Constitutional Governments (1911-1917)

New Republic (1917-1918)

Constitutional Governments (1918-1926)

Second Republic (1926-1974) 
Military Dictatorship (1926-1928)

National Dictatorship (1928-1933)

New State (1933-1974)

Third Republic (1974-present)

National Salvation Board (1974)

Interim Governments (1974-1976)

Constitutional Governments (1976-present )

See also

 Judiciary of Portugal
Justice ministry
Lista de ministros da Justiça de Portugal (List of Ministers of Justice of Portugal)
Politics of Portugal

External links

Portugal
Justice